Narodnoye Opolcheniye is a station on the Bolshaya Koltsevaya line of the Moscow Metro. It opened on 1 April 2021.

Name
During the construction of the Bolshaya Koltsevaya line, the station was named Ulitsa Narodnogo Opolcheniya ("People's Militia Street") after the nearby street of the same name. From March to May 2020, the station was named Mnyovniki in the design documentation (while the current Mnyovniki was planned to be renamed Terekhovo). In November 2020, it was proposed to name the station "Karamyshevskaya", and on December 8, Mayor of Moscow Sergei Sobyanin signed a decree assigning this name to the station. This was done for the convenience of navigation, since the Oktyabrskoe Pole station of Line 7 already exists on Narodnogo Opolcheniya Street. The name "Karamyshevskaya" was given after the Karamyshevo defence line constructed during the 1941 Battle of Moscow, which was defended by the 3rd Communist division of the People's Militia. In turn, the defence line was named after the village of Karamyshevo, which was located in this area and later became part of Moscow.

On 23 March 2021, a poll was initiated on the Active Citizen portal to change the station name. 55% of the poll participants voted for "Narodnoye Opolcheniye" and about 36% for "Karamyshevskaya".

References

Moscow Metro stations
Railway stations in Russia opened in 2021
Bolshaya Koltsevaya line
Railway stations located underground in Russia